"Hellraiser" is a song written by Ozzy Osbourne, Zakk Wylde, and Lemmy Kilmister. The song was recorded by Osbourne for his 1991 album No More Tears and also by Motörhead for their 1992 March ör Die album. Motörhead's version was released as a single.

Ozzy Osbourne version

The song appeared in the first trailer for Painkiller. It was also used as entrance music by the professional wrestling tag team The Hell Raisers (Hawk Warrior and Power Warrior) in New Japan Pro-Wrestling.

Personnel
 Ozzy Osbourne – vocals
 Randy Castillo – drums
 John Sinclair – keyboards
 Zakk Wylde – guitars
 Bob Daisley – bass

Motörhead version 

Motörhead's recording of the song was used in the 1992 film Hellraiser III: Hell on Earth, and was released as the A-side of the single and as the sixth track on their tenth studio album, March ör Die.

The B-sides of the CD single Hellraiser were "Name in Vain", which also appears on the album March ör Die, and "Dead Man's Hand" (which was also released on The One to Sing the Blues CD single, 7" & 12" vinyl singles).

The title track also appears on The '92 Tour EP.

"Hellraiser" is the first of two tracks that Mikkey Dee recorded with Motörhead before officially joining the band, the other being "Hell on Earth".

A video for "Hellraiser" was made, featuring Lemmy playing poker against Pinhead (Doug Bradley) from the Hellraiser films.

This version also has some minor lyrical alterations.

Single track listing 
 "Hellraiser" (Ozzy Osbourne, Zakk Wylde, Lemmy)
 "Name in Vain" (Phil Campbell, Würzel, Lemmy)
 "Dead Man's Hand" (Campbell, Würzel, Lemmy, Phil Taylor)

Personnel 
 Lemmy – vocals, bass
 Phil "Wizzo" Campbell – guitars
 Michael "Würzel" Burston – guitars
 Mikkey Dee – drums

30th anniversary
On October 29, 2021, a new version of "Hellraiser" was released to commemorate its 30th anniversary. It features a mashup of both Ozzy and Lemmy's vocals in one song, using the former's version as the main template. An official animated music video, directed by Mark Szumski and Gina Niespodziani, was released on YouTube the same day.

References 

1991 songs
1992 singles
Ozzy Osbourne songs
Motörhead songs
Songs written by Ozzy Osbourne
Songs written by Lemmy
Songs written by Zakk Wylde
Epic Records singles
Sony Music singles